Super C Season is the second studio album by Nigerian rap artist, Naeto C. It was released on February 7, 2011, and is available for download on iTunes.

Singles
The album has spawned four singles. The first single "Ako Mi Ti Poju" was released on September 8, 2009. Although the version released features simply the rapper, the version of the song seen on the album is an extended version, which features late Nigerian rapper "Dagrin". The song "Duro", which features artist "YQ", is the second single off the album and it was released on November 20, 2009. The track is an up-tempo party song which has Naeto C delivering three different verses and YQ lending his voice to sing the chorus. The third single released off the album "Ten over Ten" was released on August 16, 2010. It is like the latter an up-tempo party track but this time sees the rapper delivering his verses but as well singing its chorus. The fourth and final single off the album "Share My Blessings" was released on January 1, 2011 via the rapper's Twitter page with the rapper tweeting "Exclusively for my friends & fans: Be the 1st to Listen, download and share my Brand New Single featuring ASA...". It features Nigerian born soul singer "Aṣa" who lends her voice to sing the chorus of the song. The song was made available on the rapper's label "Storm360"'s  4shared account, and has so far been downloaded over 10,000 times since its release.

Accolades
Super C Season was nominated for "Best Rap Album" and "Album of the Year" at the 2012 edition of The Headies.

Track listing
The official track listing was confirmed by the rapper also via his Twitter page.

External links

References

2011 albums
Naeto C albums
2011 in Nigerian music
Albums produced by Sarz
Albums produced by Dokta Frabz
Albums produced by Tee-Y Mix